Boubacar Traoré (born 24 May 1998) is a Malian footballer who plays as a forward for Iraqi club Naft Maysan.

Club career
On the last day of the January transfermarket 2019, Traoré was one of 22 players on two hours, that signed for Turkish club Elazığspor. The club had been placed under a transfer embargo but managed to negotiate it with the Turkish FA, leading to them going on a mad spree of signing and registering a load of players despite not even having a permanent manager in place. In just two hours, they managed to snap up a record 22 players - 12 coming in on permanent contracts and a further 10 joining on loan deals until the end of the season. He arrived on loan for the rest of the season.

In August 2019, Traoré signed for Moldovan National Division club Zimbru Chișinău.

In March 2021, he signed for Iraqi Premier League club Naft Maysan.

Career statistics

Club

References

External links

1998 births
Living people
Malian footballers
Malian expatriate footballers
Association football forwards
TFF First League players
Moldovan Super Liga players
Iraqi Premier League players
Pyramids FC players
Wadi Degla SC players
Adana Demirspor footballers
Elazığspor footballers
FC Zimbru Chișinău players
Naft Maysan FC players
Malian expatriate sportspeople in Egypt
Expatriate footballers in Egypt
Malian expatriate sportspeople in Turkey
Expatriate footballers in Turkey
Malian expatriate sportspeople in Moldova
Expatriate footballers in Moldova
Malian expatriate sportspeople in Iraq
Expatriate footballers in Iraq
Mali youth international footballers
Mali under-20 international footballers
21st-century Malian people